Lagonoy Gulf is a large gulf in the Bicol Peninsula of Luzon island in the Philippines. It is separated from the Philippine Sea by the Caramoan Peninsula in the north; and is separated from Albay Gulf in the south by a chain of islands including Batan Island and Rapu-rapu Island.

The gulf is home to 480 fish species, and annual fishery production in 2004 amounted to some 20,000 MT, making Lagonoy Gulf a major fishing ground in the Philippines. Coral reefs, seaweed/seagrass beds, and mangroves form the critical habitats for gulf's ecology.

References

Gulfs of the Philippines
Gulfs of the Pacific Ocean
Landforms of Camarines Sur
Landforms of Catanduanes
Landforms of Albay